Wilfried Oellers (born 16 September 1975) is a German lawyer and politician of the Christian Democratic Union (CDU) who has been serving as a member of the Bundestag from the state of North Rhine-Westphalia since 2013.

Political career 
Oellers became a member of the Bundestag in the 2013 German federal election, representing the Heinsberg district. In parliament, he is a member of the Committee on Labour and Social Affairs.

References

External links 

 Official website (in German)
Bundestag biography 

1975 births
Living people
Members of the Bundestag for North Rhine-Westphalia
Members of the Bundestag 2021–2025
Members of the Bundestag 2017–2021
Members of the Bundestag 2013–2017
Members of the Bundestag for the Christian Democratic Union of Germany